The 1936 Chicago Cardinals season was their 17th in the league. The team failed to improve on their previous output of 6–4–2, winning only three games. Playing their first seven games on the road, they failed to qualify for the playoffs for the 11th consecutive season.

Schedule

Standings

References

1936
Chicago Cardinals
Chicago